The B4329 is a scenic route and a former turnpike in Pembrokeshire, West Wales. It links Eglwyswrw in the north of the county to Haverfordwest, the county town in the south, in an approximately southwesterly direction, crossing the Preseli Mountains.

Before the 20th century, it was the main road linking Cardigan and Haverfordwest, and featured a number of inns to sustain travellers. Much of the route is through farmland with scattered settlements, while the central section is through high moorland grazing with extensive views.

History
The road was the main link between Cardigan and Haverfordwest in mediaeval times; the future Henry VII of England would have used it to march from Haverfordwest to Cardigan between 2 and 4 August 1485 on his way to the Battle of Bosworth. In the 18th century, on the grounds that the road was badly in need of repair, it was turnpiked with a toll of six pence per cart by the 1790 Haverfordwest Roads Bill, though not without protests from parishes from Stephen's Ford, near Haverfordwest, to Cornel Fach (a.k.a. "Morris the Bailiffs") in Castlebythe parish, on account of the hardship tolls would bring to local people. In Samuel Lewis's 1833 A Topographical Dictionary of Wales it is described as the "great road" from Cardigan to Haverfordwest.

While the A487 (Cardigan to Fishguard) and the A40 (Fishguard to Haverfordwest) sections were later upgraded to trunk routes, the direct route was not, and was designated in the early 20th century road classification scheme as the B4329. From the 1920s to 1935, the B4329 was a multiplex with the A487 and an unclassified road from Boncath but reverted to the original start point in Eglwyswrw. The unclassified road became the B4332. Before that, when most journeys were made on foot, horseback or horse-drawn vehicle, travellers were provided for by inns along the route, such as those at Crosswell, Tufton, Greenway and Crundale.

Extensive views
From the high moorland, there are extensive views across much of Pembrokeshire with the Bristol Channel, St George's Channel and the Irish Sea beyond. On clear days there are views as far as the Gower Peninsula in the southeast, much of mid-Wales to the north as far as Snowdonia and the Llŷn Peninsula as well as across much of the Preseli range. The Preselis are noted for their many prehistoric sites, some of which are close to the B4329.

Because of the steep inclines in the mountains, few heavy goods vehicles use the route, which is popular with tourists and bikers. In winter, the highest parts of the road can occasionally be closed when ice or snow make driving conditions dangerous.

Route

Northern section
The road enters the Pembrokeshire Coast National Park, crossing another narrow bridge, Pont Saeson, then climbs steadily through farmland, passing a Grade II-listed 19th century circular stone structure for impounding livestock that had strayed from the mountains. Crossing a 400-year-old bridge (mentioned as Pont llin birian in c.1600) crossing Afon Brynberian, the road passes close by the hamlet of Brynberian.

Mountain section
From Brynberian, the gradient increases until the road reaches  at Tafarn-y-Bwlch (approximate English: Tavern at the Pass), an inn which existed at least as early as 1729, and still sustaining travellers as late as 1895. On an 1888 map, the inn was called Salutation Inn. Close by is Waun Mawn, whose prehistoric stones have been linked to those at Stonehenge. Immediately after the inn, the road crosses a cattle grid marking a boundary between enclosed agricultural land and unenclosed moorland and continues to climb, reaching  between Cerrig Lladron and Mynydd-du Commin. At the summit the B4329 meets the western end of the elevated track that runs from Mynachlog-ddu along the top of the range and is known as Flemings' Way or alternatively the Golden Road.

After the summit, Bwlch-Gwynt (translation: windy gap), the road drops steeply to another cattle grid and the intersection with the B4313 at Greenway, also known as New Inn, which, according to Richard Fenton in the 19th century, sustained northbound travellers before "the arduous task of winding up the painful ascent of Bwlch Gwynt". In this locale the route crosses the imaginary Landsker Line marking the change from the largely Welsh place names of north Pembrokeshire to the largely English place names in the south of the county.

Southern section
After the Greenway crossroads, the road slopes more gently downwards past Rosebush reservoir and Henry's Moat, leaving the National Park just before passing through the hamlet of Tufton, where the Tufton Arms, now a pub, stands. In the 19th century, this was the only inn in the parish, but a much older hostelry (possibly dating back to the 13th century), known as Poll-tax Inn or Paltockes Inne still stands, now a private house bypassed by road-straightening (the old road forded a stream, shown on modern maps as Portrux Ford). The road passes close by Llys y Fran Country Park, through the village of Woodstock and past Scolton Manor, bridges the Carmarthen to Fishguard railway line, then passes through the hamlets of Bethlehem and Poyston Cross and the village of Crundale in Rudbaxton parish. The inn in Crundale was the Boot and Shoe Inn, now converted to two residential dwellings. The section between Greenway and Woodstock is on the 345 bus route.

South of Crundale, the road crosses an unnamed stream at Stephen's Ford Bridge, then crosses the A40 Haverfordwest bypass on a roundabout at Withybush, and ends at another roundabout at Prendergast in the centre of Haverfordwest, connecting with the A40 spur (Cartlet Road) and the A487.

See also
 Preseli Hills
 Pembrokeshire Coast National Park

References

External links

Transport in Pembrokeshire
Roads in Pembrokeshire